Melissia is a suburb in the northeastern part of the Athens agglomeration, Greece. Since the 2011 local government reform it is part of the municipality Penteli, of which it is the seat and a municipal unit. The municipal unit has an area of 3.956 km2. Melissia is situated at the southwestern foot of the Penteli mountains, 12 km northeast of Athens city centre. It is a green residential town.

It was part of the municipality of Marousi until 1946, when it became a separate community. It became a municipality in 1990.
The population of Melissia was more than 22,000 at the 2011 census. It has six primary schools, two high schools (Greek "Gymnasium"), one lyceum and a modern municipal swimming-pool.

Historical population

See also
List of municipalities of Attica

References

External links
Official website 

Populated places in North Athens (regional unit)